Mali (Pular: 𞤍𞤢𞤤𞤭𞥅𞤪𞤫 𞤃𞤢𞥄𞤤𞤭) is a prefecture, also known as the Préfecture De Mali, located in the Labé Region of Guinea. The capital is Mali. The prefecture covers an area of 9,790 km.² and has an estimated population of 246,000.

Sub-prefectures
The prefecture is divided administratively into 13 sub-prefectures:
 Mali-Centre
 Balaki
 Donghol-Sigon
 Dougountouny
 Fougou
 Gayah
 Hidayatou
 Lébékére
 Madina-Wora
 Salambandé
 Téliré
 Touba
 Yimbéring

Administration

List of Administrators since 1958

References

Prefectures of Guinea
Labé Region